Beberlin Eunice Clara Hernández (born 9 May 1989) is a Guatemalan futsal player and a footballer who plays as a midfielder for Unifut Rosal and the Guatemala women's national team.

References

1989 births
Living people
Women's association football midfielders
Guatemalan women's footballers
Guatemala women's international footballers
Guatemalan women's futsal players